Crikey is an Australian electronic magazine comprising a website and email newsletter available to subscribers. Crikey was described by the former Federal Opposition Leader Mark Latham as the "most popular website in Parliament House" in The Latham Diaries. In 2014 it had around 17,000 paying subscribers.

History

Stephen Mayne
Crikey was founded by the activist shareholder Stephen Mayne, a journalist and former staffer of then Liberal Victorian premier Jeff Kennett. It developed out of Mayne's "jeffed.com" website, which in turn developed out of his aborted independent candidate campaign for Kennett's seat of Burwood. Longstanding Crikey political commentators/reporters have included the former Liberal insider Christian Kerr (who originally wrote under the pseudonym "Hillary Bray"), Guy Rundle, Charles Richardson, Bernard Keane, Mungo MacCallum and Hugo Kelly.

In 2003, Mayne was forced to sell his house to settle defamation cases brought by the radio presenter Steve Price and the former ALP senator Nick Bolkus over false statements published about them by Crikey.

Staff of Treasurer Peter Costello banned Crikey from the 2005, 2006 and 2007 budget 'lock ups' in which financial journalists are shown the federal budget papers some hours in advance so that their publications can report the budget in depth as soon as it is released. The grounds were that Crikey was not considered to be part of the "mainstream media".

Private Media Partners
On 1 February 2005, it was announced that Stephen Mayne had sold Crikey to Private Media Partners, a company owned by the former editor-in-chief of The Sydney Morning Herald, Eric Beecher, for A$1 million. Under the agreement, Mayne has occasionally written for the email newsletter.

Under Private Media Partners' stewardship, the publication had aimed for a more "professional" style by avoiding the use of in-house nicknames and other idiosyncrasies of the original Crikey. In February 2006, The Age reported that a co-founder and writer, Hugo Kelly, had been sacked on the grounds of professional misconduct, but Kelly maintained that Crikey had folded to political pressure and it had "no guts".

In 2022, following a war of words in which Crikey invited media proprietor Lachlan Murdoch to sue, Lachlan Murdoch commenced defamation action against Crikey for an article by Bernard Keane that suggested that "Murdoch" was an “unindicted co-conspirator” in the January 6 United States Capitol attack.

See also 
 Daily Review (website)
 Journalism in Australia

References

External links 

Australian political websites
Australian news websites